María del Sol (born Marisol de las Mercedes Echánove Rojas October 24, 1961 in Guanajuato, Guanajuato) is a Mexican singer. She is the daughter of lawyer Alonso Echánove and the actress/journalist Josefina Echánove and the younger sister of Peggy Echánove and actor Alonso Echánove.

In the 1970s, she auditioned with music producer Luis de Llano and got married at the age of 16 to Miguel Magaña, who was 14 years her senior.  They divorced a year later. In 1979, she was named The Voice of Heraldo, starred in the musical La Pandilla and was named Best New Artist at the OTI Festival. In 1980, she recorded her first album and in 1981, she won the Best Singer Prize at the Yamaha Festival in Japan.  That same year, she married Raúl Canessa, the brother of Uruguayan football player, Julio Canessa. In 1984, she starred in Joseph and the Amazing Technicolor Dreamcoat and recorded her second album, María del Sol.  Mágico was her third album, released in 1985. In 1986, she had one of her best hits, Un nuevo amor (A New Love) with her husband acting as manager.

In 1991, she starred in Cats. She later recorded the album Llegó el amor (Love Arrived).

Discography 
 RCA
 Maria Del Sol, (1980)
 Quiero Tu Vida (1982)
 Maria Del Sol (1984)
 Magico (1985)
 Un Nuevo Amor (1986)
 Plenitud (1987)
 Maria (1989)
 Contigo Y Con El Mundo: Lo Mejor De Maria Del Sol (1990)
 Volver Al Amor (1991)
 Cats: Original Cast Recording (Mexico's Production) (1992)
 Llego El Amor (2002)
 Soy Mama (2005)

References

1961 births
Living people
Singers from Guanajuato
People from Guanajuato City
20th-century Mexican women singers
21st-century Mexican women singers